Rocotopunta (Quechua rukutu, ruqutu a plant (Capsicum pubescens), punta peak; ridge) is a mountain in the Cordillera Blanca in the Andes of Peru which reaches a height of approximately . It is located in the Ancash Region, Huaylas Province, Caraz District, and in the Yungay Province, Yungay District. Rocotopunta lies west of Huandoy.

Sources

Mountains of Peru
Mountains of Ancash Region